Muhamed Keita (born 2 September 1990) is a Norwegian professional footballer who plays as a forward or winger.

Club career

Early career
Born in Banjul, Gambia, Keita began his career with Norwegian side Drafn. While with Drafn he caught the attention of Strømsgodset, joining the club's youth system in 2006.

Strømsgodset
Keita made his first team debut for Strømsgodset away against Brann, and followed this up with some notable performances: he scored a hat-trick after coming off the bench against Pors Grenland in the Norwegian Cup, and was impressive against Viking in the final match of the 2008 season. On 26 April 2009 Keita scored his first league goal for Godset, scoring on a free kick in a 1–0 victory over Stabæk.
Keita's progress caught the eye of Parma, and he attended trials with the Italian club in January 2009. However, he stayed in Norway for the next four years, winning the league with Strømsgodset in 2013.

Lech Poznań
On 2 July 2014, Keita joined Polish club Lech Poznań of the Ekstraklasa. On 20 July 2014, he made his league debut for Lech, starting in a 4–0 victory over Piast Gliwice. On 26 October 2014, he scored an 80th-minute goal to lead his club to a 1–0 victory over Górnik Łęczna. This was also his first goal with his new side. On 3 March 2015, Keita scored in a 5–1 victory over Znicz Pruszków in a Polish Cup match. On 4 April 2015, he opened the scoring for Lech in a 2–1 victory over GKS Bełchatów. In his first year in Poland, Keita helped his club capture the 2014–15 Ekstraklasa title. During the season he appeared in 28 matches and scored three goals.

Stabæk
On 22 June 2015, Keita returned to Norway joining  Stabæk on loan. On 25 July 2015, he made his debut for Stabæk in a 2–2 draw with FK Haugesund. On 19 September 2015, Keita scored in extra time to help his club to a 2–1 victory over Tromsø, the goal was his first for Stabæk. On 23 September, he continued his scoring form for Stabæk, scoring his team's opening goal in a 3–2 loss to BK Rosenborg in the Norwegian Cup semi-finals. The following match day of 27 September he scored in his third straight match, this time leading Stabæk to a 1–0 victory over league rival Molde. He ended the season appearing in 13 matches scoring three goals as Stabæk finished in third place qualifying for the 2016–17 UEFA Europa League.

Return to Strømsgodset
During January 2016, Keita returned to Strømsgodset on loan from Lech Poznań. During his second spell with the club he scored many key goals for Strømsgodset. On 22 May 2016, he helped his club to a 3–2 come from behind victory over Vålerenga, scoring the first goal of the match for Godset.  On 4 July 2016, he opened the scoring for his club in a 4–2 victory over Aalesund. Keita contributed with a game-winning goal the next matchday to help Godset to a 1–0 victory over Viking. On 17 July 2016, he was once again on the scoresheet as he scored a late goal to lead his club to a 1–0 victory over Tromsø. On 21 July 2016, he continued his fine form scoring a brace to help his side to a 2–2 draw against Danish club SønderjyskE in a Europa League match.

Return to Stabæk
On 17 August 2016, it was announced that Keita would be returning on loan to Stabæk as the club was embroiled in a relegation battle. In his short stint with the club he scored three key goals to help Stabæk avoid relegation. On 21 August 2016, he made his return for Stabæk scoring in a 3–0 victory over Aalesund. On 18 September Keita scored another goal to lead Stabæk to a 1–0 victory over Odd. On 16 October he scored from the penalty spot to help Stabæk gain a valuable point in a 1–1 draw against Vålerenga.

Vålerenga
On 25 March 2017, Keita was loaned to Norwegian side Vålerenga. During his short loan spell he appeared in 6 league matches scoring one goal. On 6 April 2017 he scored for the club in a 4–3 loss to Haugesund.

New York Red Bulls
On 28 July 2017, Keita signed a multi-year deal with Major League Soccer side New York Red Bulls. On 2 September 2017, he made his debut for New York appearing in a 2–2 draw at FC Dallas. On 22 October 2017, in the last game of the regular season, Keita recorded an assist by finding defender Michael Murillo for a game-tying goal against DC United in a 2–1 win. He was released from the club on 3 February 2018.

Third spell at Strømsgodset
Keita returned to his first club, Strømsgodset for the 2019 season, but failed to impress. He was released from the club after the 2019 season.

Ohod Club
On 2 January 2020, Keita signed with Ohod Club before being released the same month.

Career statistics

Club

Honours
Strømsgodset
Tippeligaen: 2013
Norwegian Football Cup: 2010

Lech Poznań
Ekstraklasa: 2014-15

References

External links 
 
 
 Keita at altomfotball.no

1990 births
Living people
Sportspeople from Drammen
Gambian emigrants to Norway
Naturalised citizens of Norway
Norwegian footballers
Strømsgodset Toppfotball players
Lech Poznań players
Stabæk Fotball players
Vålerenga Fotball players
New York Red Bulls players
Ohod Club players
Eliteserien players
Ekstraklasa players
Major League Soccer players
Saudi First Division League players
Norway under-21 international footballers
Norway youth international footballers
Norwegian expatriate footballers
Expatriate footballers in Poland
Expatriate soccer players in the United States
Expatriate footballers in Saudi Arabia
Norwegian expatriate sportspeople in Poland
Norwegian expatriate sportspeople in the United States
Norwegian expatriate sportspeople in Saudi Arabia
Association football forwards